Ranger's Code is a 1933 American Western film directed by Robert North Bradbury and written by Harry L. Fraser. The film stars Bob Steele, Doris Hill, Ernie Adams, George Nash, Ed Brady and George "Gabby" Hayes. The film was released on August 15, 1933, by Monogram Pictures.

Plot

Cast           
Bob Steele as Bob Baxter
Doris Hill as Mary Clayton
Ernie Adams as Nat the Bat
George Nash as Danny Clayton
Ed Brady as Bert
George "Gabby" Hayes as Baxter 
Hal Price as Sheriff
Dick Dickinson as Henchman
Frank Ball as Rancher

References

External links
 

1933 films
1930s English-language films
American Western (genre) films
1933 Western (genre) films
Monogram Pictures films
Films directed by Robert N. Bradbury
American black-and-white films
1930s American films